Aleksandar Đurić (Anglicized: Aleksandar Djuric; ; born 2 August 1982) is an Austrian professional basketball coach and former player.

Playing career 
A center, Đurić played 14 seasons in Austria and abroad from 1999 to 2013. During his playing days, he played for Kapfenberg Bulls, Crvena zvezda, Telekom Baskets Bonn, Apollon Patras, Khimik, Politekhnika-Halychyna, Achilleas Kaimakli, Güssing Knights, Fürstenfeld Panthers, and Vienna DC Timberwolves. He retired as a player with Vienna DC Timberwolves in 2013.

National team career 
Đurić was a member of the Austria national team at the FIBA EuroBasket 2013 qualification.

Career achievements
 Austrian Bundesliga champion: 3 (with Kapfenberg Bulls: 2000–01, 2001–02, 2002–03)
 Austrian SuperCup winner: 2 (with Kapfenberg Bulls: 2002, 2003)
 Serbian-Montenegrin Cup winner: 1 (with Crvena zvezda: 2003–04)

References

External links
 Player Profile at eurobasket.com
 Player Profile at basketball-reference.com
 Player Profile at realgm.com
 Player Profile at eurocupbasketball.com

1982 births
Living people
ABA League players
Achilleas Kaimakli players
Apollon Patras B.C. players
Austrian basketball coaches
Austrian expatriate basketball people in Germany
Austrian expatriate basketball people in Serbia
Austrian men's basketball players
Austrian people of Serbian descent
Basketball League of Serbia players
BC Khimik players
BC Politekhnika-Halychyna players
Centers (basketball)
Kapfenberg Bulls players
KK Crvena zvezda players
People from Bregenz
Power forwards (basketball)
Serbian men's basketball players
Serbian expatriate basketball people in Cyprus
Serbian expatriate basketball people in Greece
Serbian expatriate basketball people in Germany
Serbian expatriate basketball people in Ukraine
Telekom Baskets Bonn players
UBC Güssing Knights players
Sportspeople from Vorarlberg